Sven Erik Paulsen (born 30 March 1946) is a Norwegian boxer. He competed in the men's lightweight event at the 1972 Summer Olympics.

References

1946 births
Living people
Norwegian male boxers
Olympic boxers of Norway
Boxers at the 1972 Summer Olympics
Sportspeople from Trondheim
Lightweight boxers
20th-century Norwegian people